Lattanzio is an Italian surname and given name. Notable people with the name include:

Given name
Lattanzio Gambara (c. 1530–1574), Italian painter
Lattanzio Lattanzi (d. 1587), Italian Roman Catholic bishop
Lattanzio Mainardi (fl. 16th century), Italian painter
Lattanzio Pagani (active after 1543, died circa 1582), Italian painter
Lattanzio da Rimini (active 1492 — 1505), Italian painter

Surname
Carlo Lattanzio (born 1997), Argentine footballer
Chris Lattanzio (born 1963), American artist 
Ettore Lattanzio (born 1990), Canadian football defensive lineman
Giannina Lattanzio (born 1993), Italian-born Ecuadorian footballer 
Patricia Lattanzio, Canadian politician and lawyer
Vittorio Lattanzio (1926–2010), Italian politician and physician

Given names
Italian-language surnames